George Seybold House, also known as the Fred W. Kelley House, is a historic home located at Waveland, Montgomery County, Indiana. It was built in 1886 and is a three-story, Stick style frame dwelling with a 1½-story rear wing. The building features embellished gable ends with decorative vergeboards, king post trusses, and brackets.

It was listed on the National Register of Historic Places in 2002.

References

Houses on the National Register of Historic Places in Indiana
Houses completed in 1886
Stick-Eastlake architecture in the United States
Houses in Montgomery County, Indiana
National Register of Historic Places in Montgomery County, Indiana